James Hawes (born 1960) is a British novelist and popular historian who has been, unusually, an official bestseller in both genres. He has also written theatrically released screen adaptations of two of his works. He teaches creative writing at Oxford University and Oxford Brookes University. In 2022 he was Series Story Consultant/key on-screen contributor for BBCTV's 8-part documentary, Art That Made Us and was chosen by Andrew Davies to help create an original TV drama series for Lionsgate.

Early life and education 
Hawes grew up in Gloucestershire, Edinburgh and Shropshire. As an undergraduate, he studied German at Hertford College, Oxford. In 1985–1986 he was in charge of CADW excavations at Blaenavon Ironworks, now a UNESCO World Heritage site. He went on to study for a Ph.D. on Nietzsche and German literature 1900–1914 at University College, London in 1987–89, before lecturing in German at Maynooth University (Ollscoil Mhá Nuad), Sheffield University and Swansea University.

Writing
Hawes has published six novels, two of which he has adapted as films, starring Rhys Ifans and Michael Sheen respectively. The first two, A White Merc with Fins (1996) and Rancid Aluminium (1997) were both Sunday Times bestsellers.

In 2005 Random House published his novel Speak for England, which predicted Brexit so accurately that the Observer later declared "it deserves some kind of prescience prize" (Observer 23.4.2017). His Kafka biography, Excavating Kafka (2008), was adapted as a BBCTV documentary, Kafka Uncovered (2009). Englanders and Huns, a detailed history of  Anglo-German relationships from 1864 to 1914, was shortlisted in the Paddy Power Political Books of the Year 2015.

He has taught on the Oxford University MSt. in Creative Writing since 2005. In 2008, he was also appointed Senior Lecturer in Creative Writing at Oxford Brookes University. In 2012 he was promoted to Reader. Among his former students there are Kit de Waal (My Name is Leon) Catherine Chanter (The Well) and Anne Youngson (Meet me at the Museum).

His book The Shortest History of Germany (Old St.) was published in May 2017. It reached #2 in the Sunday Times non-fiction pb bestsellers (May 2018). The Shortest History of England (2020) reached #4 in The Times non-fiction pb bestsellers. His latest book is Brilliant Isles, the tie-in to the BBCTV series Art That Made Us (2022). Throughout June 2022 he was on the three-person writing team chosen by Andrew Davies to help create an original TV drama series for Lionsgate.

Bibliography
A White Merc With Fins (1996)
Rancid Aluminium (1997 – screenplay 2000)
Dead Long Enough (2000 – screenplay 2005)
White Powder, Green Light (2002)
Speak for England (2005)
My Little Armalite (2008)
Excavating Kafka (2008 – published in the United States as Why You Should Read Kafka Before You Waste Your Life)
Englanders and Huns: The Culture Clash which Led to the First World War (2014)
The Shortest History of Germany (2017)
The Shortest History of England (2020)

References

https://www.bbc.co.uk/programmes/b00fr8j9

External links
 Hawes' website
2005 interview with 3:AM Magazine
 Hawes at the British Council website 

21st-century English novelists
Academics of Oxford Brookes University
1960 births
Living people
English male novelists
21st-century English male writers